Mélisey may refer to:
 Mélisey, Haute-Saône, a commune in France
 Mélisey, Yonne, a commune in France